The following lists the top 25 singles of 2011  in Australia from the Australian Recording Industry Association (ARIA) end-of-year singles chart.

"Party Rock Anthem" by LMFAO featuring Lauren Bennett and GoonRock was the biggest song of the year, peaking at #1 for 10 weeks.

References

Australian record charts
2011 in Australian music
Australia Top 25 Singles